Mazegh-e Pain (also Romanized as Māzegh-e Pā’īn and Māzegh Pā’īn; also known as Māzegh) is a village in Tiab Rural District, in the Central District of Minab County, Hormozgan Province, Iran. At the 2006 census, its population was 1,023, in 197 families.

References 

Populated places in Minab County